The following is a list of fictional United States presidents, A through B.

A

President Truman Abbott
 President in: The Vegas Legacy by Ovid Demaris (1983).
 Runs for a second term when arriving in Las Vegas for his party's convention.
 Is challenged for re-nomination by former governor Hamilton Foote.
 Cuts a deal with mobsters to take on corrupt Nevada senator Randolph Godwin as a running mate.

President William Abbott
 President in: Advise and Consent
 Speaker of the House and a Representative from Colorado.
 Succeeds to presidency upon assassination of President Harley Hudson.
 Declines to run for reelection, which leads to the election contest between Orrin Knox (The Promise of Joy) and Edward M. Jason (Come Nineveh, Come Tyre).

President George Abnego
 President in: "Null-P" by William Tenn (1947 short story).
 Elected for being an average guy, and serves numerous terms with no solid opposition after his second election.
 His direct descendants continue to be elected as US presidents, then as Presidents of the World in later generations.

President Howard T. Ackerman
 President in: Command & Conquer: Red Alert 3
 President in an alternate history where the United States faces both the Soviet Union and Japanese Empire in a futuristic World War.
 Played by: J. K. Simmons

President John Ackerman
 President in: Indigo Prophecy/Fahrenheit

President Alan Adams 
 President in: Shadowrun
 Serves from 2049 to 2053
 Party: Democratic
 Defeats incumbent Carl Preston in the 2048 election
 4th UCAS President and 50th US President
 President throughout the First Edition of the Shadowrun RPG
 Is succeeded by VP Thomas Steel (D) in 2053 after Adams dies the day after his second inauguration.

President Barbara Jacqueline Adams
 President in: Whoops Apocalypse
 Played by: Loretta Swit
 Succeeds to presidency upon death of the previous president. Her incompetence helps cause World War Three.
 Husband owns a weapons company that deliberately instigates World War Three to sell arms.

President David Jefferson Adams

 President in: Shattered Union
 Most unpopular President in US history, he is declared the winner of the 2008 election by Congress after a tie vote
 His administration sees increased domestic terrorism in 2010, resulting in the declaration of martial law in California in 2011
 A sham election, perpetrated by the United States Supreme Court disqualifying several more popular candidates, results in his "reelection" in 2012.
 Is killed, along with most of the federal government, when a nuclear bomb is detonated in Washington, D. C. during the inauguration on January 20, 2013.
 His death directly leads to the fragmentation of the United States and the start of the Second American Civil War.

President John Fitzgerald "Jack" Adams
 President in: Lucky Bastard by Charles McCarry (1992 novel)
 Born in 1944.
 Believes himself to be the illegitimate son of John F. Kennedy and is recruited by the KGB in college.

President Joshua T. Adams
 President in: Independence Day: Resurgence
 Investigates a crashed intact alien spacecraft in the ocean on July 5, 1996
 Commanding general of Earth Space Defense
 Sworn in as (presumably acting) president after his predecessor Elizabeth Lanford was killed by aliens along with the entirety of the United States presidential line of succession at Cheyenne Mountain Complex in 2016
 Has a wife named Janine
 Played by: William Fichtner

President Sam Adams
 President in: The Insider by Jack Nesbit.
 Former U.S. Representative and senator.
 Appointed vice president by President Will Simpson after the assassination of his first vice president.
 After he is elected president it is discovered by his chief of staff that he was behind the death of the vice president.

President John Quincy Adding Machine
 President in: Futurama, mentioned in A Head in the Polls.
 The first robot President of Earth (a position that evolved from that of President of the United States).
 As the President of Earth is directly elected, he is elected by just one vote.
 He promised not to go on a killing spree, which was a promise he was unable to keep.
 He was elected in part because of the enfranchisement of robots (with Bender being prohibited for being a convicted felon).

President Adler
 President in: Jack & Bobby
 Controversial president during the War of the Americas. Adler is criticized as a war criminal for his handling of the war and is subsequently arrested by the president of Finland during Robert McCallister's administration and charged with war crimes.

President P.J. Aimes
 President in: The Summit (TV mini-series, 2008)
 Conservative who attends a summit in Canada discussing an international tax and an anti-terrorism measure during his last year in office.
 Is willing to support the tax in exchange for support on the anti-terrorism measure, but withdraws his support when terrorists demand the tax be passed.
 Serves two terms.
 Party: Republican.
 Played by Christopher Plummer

President James "Jimmy" Alderdice
President in: E Pluribus Bang by David Lippincott (1970 novel).
Former governor of California, Alderdice's campaign slogan is "Law and Order, and Like it!"
Refuses medical treatment (as a Christian Scientist) for a cold he catches while being sworn into office, and dies five days later.
Succeeded by Vice President George Ramsey Kirk.

President David Alexander
 President in: Megiddo: The Omega Code 2
 Vice president before becoming president after the mysterious death of his predecessor. He is thrown out of office for not complying with his brother's New World order.
 Played by: Michael Biehn

President Josh Alexander
 President in: Act of Treason and Protect and Defend by Vince Flynn
 Party: Democratic
 Governor of Georgia
 Married to Jillian Rautbort Alexander
 Running mate is Mark Ross, three-term senator from Connecticut and hawkish Director of National Intelligence
 Ross is killed the day of the inauguration by CIA Director Irene Kennedy without the knowledge of Alexander. Alexander believes he died of a heart attack.
 Threatens war with Iran after Irene Kennedy is kidnapped and Iran sinks one of their own submarines, blaming it on the US.
 Along with Chief of Staff Byrne, Alexander uses football analogies to describe his policies.

President Mackenzie Allen

 President in: Commander in Chief
 Allen, the vice president under President Theodore Roosevelt "Teddy" Bridges, becomes the first female president in history after his death. She is married and has three children. Prior to becoming president, Allen was a prosecutor and congresswoman from Connecticut.
 When the dying Bridges and the Republican Party leadership requests her resignation in favor of a "more appropriate" leader, she refuses.
 Privately states that her main political enemy is Speaker of the House Nathan Templeton.
 Played by: Geena Davis
 Party: Independent, formerly a moderate Republican

President Kathy Alton
 President in: The Illuminati by Larry Burkett
 Widow of Mars expedition commander Colonel Lee Alton. Dies in office by electrocution from a hairdryer in her bathtub.
 Party: Democratic

President Dante Alvarado
President in The Mandibles
Born in Oaxaca, Mexico, and is elected in 2028.
Elected after the Constitution is amended to permit foreign-born persons to become president.
Renounces the national debt in the Great Renunciation, which leads to a decade-long depression.
Party: Democratic

President Alvarez
 President in: Shooter (season 3)
 First Hispanic president.
 Previously served in the United States Marine Corps and received training at Parris Island. 
 Becomes aware of a secretive cabal called Atlas operating within his government, led by Undersecretary of Agriculture Red Bama Sr. The group murders his Chief of Staff Andrew Gold, framing it to appear as a drunk driving accident. 
 He is pressured into nominating Judge Raymond Brooks to the Supreme Court, which would allow Atlas to have a swing vote on the court for decades in the future. When Brooks commits suicide after being kidnapped by Bob Lee Swagger, Alvarez refuses to cooperate with the cabal any further.
 Unable to trust the majority of people in his administration, he enlists the help of FBI Special Agent Nadine Memphis and staffer Harris Downey to help bring down Atlas. 
 Played by: Benito Martinez.

President Juanita Alvarez
 President in: Sunstorm
 President of the U.S. in December 2037; leaves office some time before 2042.

President Rose Ambrose
 President in: a National Lampoon article in the 1980s
 She becomes vice president under President O'Looney, and then president after inducing a fatal heart attack in him during sex.
 Tired of the presidency, Ambrose asks her aide, Wendy Hauser, to assassinate her. Although Hauser cannot go through with it, former First Lady to President O'Looney and others carry out the assassination. Ambrose is shot over 1,500 times, but it is reported that a lone gunman was responsible.

President Esker Scott Anderson
 President in: The Company by John Ehrlichman, adapted as TV miniseries Washington: Behind Closed Doors.
 Anderson is a roman à clef representation of Lyndon Baines Johnson.
 Former senator from Oregon, elected vice president with President William Arthur Curry.
 Becomes president when Curry is killed when Air Force One crashes.
 Serves eighteen months of President Curry's term, plus one full term of his own.
 Declines to run for a second term due to an illness.
 Party: Democratic
 Played by Andy Griffith

President Johnson P. Annarbor
 President in: Newsreaders
 Serves from 1889 to 1893.
 Completely forgotten by history.
 First president to be elected despite losing both the popular and electoral vote.
 Party: Republicans

President Caesare Appleton
 President in: Emperor of America
 Party: Royalty Party
 His name is a reference to Julius Caesar, his career mirrors that of Napoleon Bonaparte, and he satirizes Ronald Reagan
 Appleton is a colonel in the United States Army who defeats an attempted Sandinista invasion of Western Europe. The Royalty Party and National Rifle Association destroy Washington, D.C. with a nuclear bomb on March 18, 1990, with Appleton declaring himself president shortly after. He eventually becomes Caesare I, Emperor of America.

President Gabriel Arana
President in: The Mesopotamian Candidate by Barnara Fowler
 Gabriel Arana, an infantry officer in the Vietnam War, is horribly wounded in an ambush and sees almost all soldiers and officers in his unit killed or mutilated. Deeply traumatized physically and mentally, he undergoes prolonged rehabilitation and  recovers with Joan's (a nurse) help, who eventually marries him. He resolves to go into politics to help create a better world and prevent new wars. He is elected president, but in his second year in office he suffers from increasing nightmares and terrible images. One night, he sees clearly the face of Rick, his second-in-command and best friend who was killed in Vietnam. Rick tells Gabriel that he is an incarnation of the ancient hero Gilgamesh while Rick is the incarnation of Gilgamesh's companion and friend Enkidu. He warns Gabriel that he is being manipulated by the goddess Innana, who plots to break into the modern world and make Gabriel her puppet to seize control of the US nuclear arsenal and use it to enhance her divine powers, before using them to raze all Christian, Jewish, and Muslim places of worship. Gabriel confronts Innana with his allies, but is nearly overwhelmed by the goddess when Joan appears at his side. Joan is revealed to be a different avatar of Innana. Straining with all their remaining strength and still getting pushed back, Gabriel and Joan realize that the only way to seal the hole in the astral plane and keep Innana out of the mundane world is to pour their entire life force into the breach, which they do without hesitation.

President Archer
 President in: Van Helsing
 Was presumably Vice-President to President Davis Park prior to the Rising and was sworn in when he was presumed to be killed by the vampires.
 Revealed in Season 4 to still be alive and leading the portions of America still under human control.
 Travels to Fort Collins to personally investigate things after her envoy is killed by the Oracle. She arrives after Jack and Violet have entered the Dark Realm to confront Dracula and returned, with Jack seemingly unharmed and Violet unconscious. Informed about everything that has happened, she offers to escort the Van Helsings and their friends to the safe zone to work together to fight the other vampires.
 Is killed by Dracula, who trapped Jack in the Dark Realm and took her form to escape. Dracula proceeds to take Archer's form in order to take over the safe zone and further her own agenda.
 Played by: Jill Teed

President Joseph Armando
 President in: Mars
 Nation's first Hispanic president. Elected sometime in the early 21st century.
 During his administration, NASA orchestrates the first crewed mission to Mars.
 Party: Democratic

President-Elect Robert Arthur
 Elected President at the end of The Manchurian Candidate
 Running mate Raymond Shaw is a mind-controlled puppet of multinational corporation Manchurian Global
 Wins against Vice President Nelson.
 Targeted by Manchurian Global to ensure they have a man in the White House.
 Raymond Shaw and his mother Elanor Prentiss-Shaw are killed in New York by Ben Marco.
 FBI cover up Marco's involvement and put the blame on Manchurian Global.
 Party: Unnamed. Implied to be Democratic

President Chester Z. Arthur
 President in: Futurama
 Served as either President of the U.S. or Earth prior to the year 3000.
 Only seen in the episode "All the Presidents' Heads"
 By 3011, his head has been preserved inside a head in a jar at the New New York Head Museum.
 Parody of Chester A. Arthur, who also resides at the Head Museum.

President Janice Ashby
 President in: An Absolutely Remarkable Thing and A Beautifully Foolish Endeavor
 President during humanity's first contact with Carl.

President Benjamin Asher
 President in: Olympus Has Fallen and London Has Fallen
 Married to Margaret Asher until her death in a car accident while travelling to a fundraiser from Camp David. He is the sole parent of their son, Connor Asher.
 Kidnapped and held hostage in 2013 when North Korean terrorists take over the White House by disguising themselves as members of the South Korean delegation. Later shot during an altercation with the terrorist leader Kang Yeonsak, but survives.
 Captured again when visiting London in 2016 by Islamic terrorists loyal to Aamir Barkawi, after several coordinated bombings and attacks in the city decimate his security detail.
 Is to be executed on an internet livestream, but survives due to a joint effort of SAS, US Secret Service and Delta Force.
Secret Service codename: "Southpaw"
 Party: Not mentioned, but implied to be Republican.
 Played by: Aaron Eckhart

President Henry Ashton
 President in: Vantage Point
 Secret Service codename: "Eagle"
 The president's body double is shot during an assassination attempt in Salamanca, Spain, where he is attending a global summit on global terrorism. The actual president is kidnapped but rescued by Secret Service Agent Thomas Barnes.
 Party: Unknown
 Played by: William Hurt

President "The Astro-nut"
 President in: Swan Song
Former astronaut and senator
 Is persuaded into taking a foreign policy stance which causes World War III by his military advisors.
 Is left guilt-ridden by the nuclear destruction.
 Survives the destruction of his plane over Virginia and spends the next seven years as a hermit inside a West Virginia coal mine.
 Meets and cares for at least one refugee over the next seven years while suffering from mental and/or physical trauma that cause him to believe that he is God, fallen from the heavens, and entrusted with the duty of using the nuclear football salvaged from  his plane to scourge the world in the event that "evil" triumphs in the war's aftermath.
 Is murdered by the novel's antagonist after arming his missiles, in a failed attempt to make sure they will still launch if he changes his mind.

President Richard Tucker Attenborough
 President in: Shelley's Heart by Charles McCarry (1995 novel)
 Speaker of the House, he becomes president after the resignation of impeached President Bedford Forrest Lockwood.
 Next in line of succession due to the death of Vice President Williston Graves.
 His efforts resolve a Constitutional crisis due to an election stolen by computer fraud.
 Leaves office under the provisions of the 25th Amendment as soon as Vice President Sam Clark is confirmed by the Congress due to ill health.
 Party: Democratic

President Nicholas Franklin Augustine
 President in: Acts of Mercy by Bill Pronzini and Barry N. Malzberg
 Formerly a junior senator from California
 Works closely with his chief domestic aide, Maxwell Harper, and Secret Service agent Christopher Justice to investigate a plot against him.
 Augustine is revealed to have gone insane, that neither Harper nor Justice are actual people, and that all his conversations with them throughout the book have been figments of his imagination.

B

President Talcott Quincy Bailey
 President in: 34 East by Alfred Coppel.
 Wealthy New Englander who served as a U.S. senator.
 On his way to a summit meeting with the Soviet Deputy Premier in the Sinai Desert, his convoy was ambushed and he is captured by terrorists.
 While he is being taken prisoner, Air Force One crashes due to the pilot having a sudden heart attack and the president is mortally wounded.
 Bailey is rescued just before a nuclear war is about to be launched.

President Phil Baker
 President in: Supergirl
 Former vice president who becomes president when Olivia Marsdin resigns.
 Lex Luthor takes out Marsdin's original running mate so Senator Baker could take their place.
 Secretly colluding with Luthor, Baker works to persecute aliens living in America, eventually putting Ben Lockwood in charge of all alien affairs and deputizing Lockwood's "Children of Liberty" hate group.
 Arrested after his association with Luthor is exposed.
 Played by Bruce Boxleitner
 Party: Democratic

President Bill Baker
 President in: Invasion by Eric L. Harry (novel)
 Former B-movie actor, he leads the United States when it is invaded by China. Shortly before the invasion he orders the conscription of all 18–24-year-old Americans.
 Has an estranged daughter, Stephie, a soldier who is drafted into the U.S. Army.
 Presumably based on Ronald Reagan.
 Party: Republican

President Robert Baker
 President in: The Peacekeeper
 Speaks with a southern accent.
 Former Chief of Staff of the United States Army
 Running for re-election. 
 Played by: Roy Scheider

President Samuel Baker
 President in: Favorite Son by Steve Sohmer (1988 novel), the NBC miniseries (played by James Whitmore), and Patriots (1990 novel)
 Former U.S. Senator from Virginia.
 Elected in 1984.
 Baker attempts to drop Vice President Daniel Eastman in favor of Texas Senator Terry Fallon as his running mate in 1988.
 In 1991 is faced with a military coup d'état by a group of fanatical Vietnam veterans who are upset that President Baker pledged to sign a nuclear arms treaty with the Soviet Union.

President William Ballard
 President in: Politika by Tom Clancy
 During his administration, Boris Yeltsin dies of a heart attack. A group of Russian freedom fighters attempt to spark a civil war within Russia in the hopes of overthrowing the government.
 Injured in an assassination attempt while attending Yeltsin's funeral, but survives.
 Party: Democratic

President John Ballentine
 President in: The Sentinel
 Targeted for assassination at a G8 summit in Toronto (film)
 Secret Service code name: Classic (film), Victory (novel)
 Played by David Rasche
 Party: Republican

President James Ballantine
 President in: Tom Clancy's Ghost Recon Advanced Warfighter (2006 video game)
 Visits Mexico City to sign the fictional North American Joint Security Agreement (NAJSA) with the Mexican President and the Canadian Prime Minister.
 Survives an assassination and multiple kidnapping attempts in Mexico City during a coup d'état by Mexican soldiers opposed to NAJSA; rescued by the Ghosts Special Forces Team.

President Cliff Barnes
 President in: "Conundrum" (aired May 3, 1991, Dallas (1978 TV series) episode)
 In an alternate universe where J.R. Ewing had never been born, Barnes attains a successful political career and becomes the vice president. When the president has a stroke, Barnes is promoted and, according to "Adam", the otherworldly being who guides J.R. through this alternate world, is one of the country's greatest.
 Played by: Ken Kercheval

President Harry Barnes
 President in: 24 Declassified novels
 43rd President (1997–2001)
 Party: Republican
 Loses to David Palmer in the 2000 presidential election.

President Pamela Barnes
 President in The President's Daughter by Bill Clinton and James Patterson
 Former vice president to the novel's protagonist Matthew Keating, before she defeats him in the primary elections
 Challenged by Keating to a rematch for the upcoming election at the end of the novel

President Leo Barnett
 President in: Wild Cards
 May have had the superhuman ability to heal injuries and diseases

President Josiah "Jed" Bartlet

 President in: The West Wing
 Has relapsing and remitting multiple sclerosis
 Played by: Martin Sheen, who has been introduced at speaking engagements before audiences as "the Acting President of The United States".

President Andy Bates
 President in: Deadlands: Hell on Earth roleplaying game.
 Known as "A-Bomb Andy" for his pro-nuclear war stance against the Confederacy.
 Elected as vice president in 2078, takes office in 2081 when Mary Rose Tremane disappears.
 Dies on September 23, 2081, when Washington, D.C. is hit with a nuclear missile.

President Edward Bates
 President in: Tripod Worship, the second volume of Nora Cummings' Tripod Trilogy
 Born in a world where the Martian invaders of H. G. Wells' The War of the Worlds proved resistant to Earth microbes and have ruled the world for over a century. Born to a physicist father and from a young age trained in science at the secret Underground Harvard, hidden in deep tunnels under the Rocky Mountains. Realizes that efforts to duplicate the Martian heat ray are futile, as the task is far beyond the resources available to the hidden resisting humans. However, he finds an alternative which is possible - a shield protecting against the heat ray. Protected by such shields, human artillery can be brought into play and destroy the Martians' Tripod Fighting Machine. The Martians, having grown complacent, are swiftly destroyed in large parts of North America, and submarines are sent  to share the secret with Resistance groups in Europe, China and South Africa. Having no military talent, Bates left the fighting  for those more qualified for it, but in the aftermath showed an enormous administrative and political talent. The Resisters, coming into the open, were virtually unanimous in accepting him as Provisional President, pending the time when elections could be held. This proved far  longer and more difficult than the Resisters thought, when dreaming of Liberation from the Martians. First, they had to contend with Gerald The Fat and Camburcio the Green Egg, two leaders of the collaborator militia which was set up by the Martians, who used to hunt other humans for the Martians' consumption and get richly rewarded for it. Deeply hated and knowing that they could expect nothing but summary execution, the two and their followers kept fighting for several years before being finally subdued. Even then, there was the problem of Tripod Worship, the religion created by the Martians at the advice of their human collaborators. In Tripod Worship, the Martians were worshiped as gods, and having one's blood drained by them was considered a Holy Act, ensuring one of Eternal Bliss. To his chagrin, Bates discovered that Tripod Worship was still very much alive in various parts of the country, and that its followers hated Bates as a Profaner, Desecrator and God-killer, and were fervently praying for the Martians' return. In some places, it was possible to get rid of the cult - but there were big enclaves where it was deeply rooted, especially in the Pacific Northwest, the Southwest, the Deep South, The Ozarks and the Appalachians. At a special session in the Provisional White House - actually, a well-preserved pre-Martian farm house in Kansas - Bates firmly vetoed the idea of militarily conquering these enclaves and forcibly rooting out Tripod Worship. Not only would it drain much of the resources needed to rebuild the country, it would be morally corrosive and destroy any chance of the United States becoming a democracy again. The fledgling provisional government would be thrust into the role of a religious persecutor, forbidding people to practice a religion they believed in, however unpalatable; the more determined the government in seeking to uproot Tripod Worship, the more martyrs it would create. Much better, rather, for these enclaves to be left alone for the time being, for later generations to deal with and hopefully re-integrate them with a minimum of violence. "Our immediate task is with the ordinary people, just emerging from a century of horror - those not caught up in this vile cult. Even they need very much patient education" he said. "I estimate at least ten years, more likely fifteen or twenty, before people understand democracy and can hold elections and we have a Congress which can examine the Old Constitution and decide how much of it we should keep and what we need to amend. And I hope that when Presidential elections are held, an opposing candidate will emerge to defeat me by a landslide. That will be my greatest victory!"

President Joe Bauer (aka Not Sure)
 President in: Idiocracy
 U.S. Army Private Joe Bauer is frozen for five hundred years, and succeeds President Camacho after being Camacho's late-term appointment as Secretary of Interior (and later Vice President), sometime after 2505. Due to a record keeping mistake, is listed in official records as first name Not, last name Sure.
 Elected president due to success in ending nationwide famine by getting crops to grow, and for having the highest IQ on the planet.
 Champions a mostly unsuccessful effort to revive cultural development and education.
 Played by Luke Wilson.

President Buster Baxter
 President in: Arthur
 In one episode, Arthur imagines Buster as president.
 Played by: Daniel Brochu

President Baywater
 President in: Noah by Sebastian Fitzek
 Is a controlled puppet of a secret, worldwide society of elitists that exceeds democratic elected governments

Acting President Fowler Beal
 President in: 34 East by Alfred Coppel (novel).
 Originally Speaker of the House when the president is killed in the crash of Air Force One.
 Becomes acting president when Vice President Talcott Quincy Bailey is taken hostage by Arab terrorists in the Sinai.
 Nearly launches a nuclear attack on the Soviet Union after being persuaded by Admiral Stuart Ainsworth.

President "The Beast"
 President in: Transmetropolitan
 Dubbed "The Beast" by Spider Jerusalem, who despises him, in an editorial.
 Subsequently defeated in a landslide by candidate Gary Callahan.

President David Beccerra
 President in: Tom Clancy's EndWar
 First Hispanic US president
 During his presidency, the US launches the Freedom Star Military Space Station amid global protests.
 The U.S. and Europe engage in an arms race.
 World War III occurs between the U.S., Russia, and Europe.

President Tom Beck
 President in: Deep Impact
 During his administration, much of the Eastern Seaboard is devastated by a comet impact in the Atlantic Ocean that causes a megatsunami.
 He leads his country during the crisis and personally leads the reconstruction efforts after the second comet is destroyed.
 Nation's first African-American president.
 Played by: Morgan Freeman

President Anthony Berg-Hoffman
 President in: Who is The Boss Here? 
 Suspected of having murdered his secretary, Susan Fowls, who threatened to reveal their affair
 On the eve of his impeachment proceedings in Congress, the world is struck by ecological crisis and New York City is destroyed by tidal waves
 Considered a hero for leading the nation out of the crisis, all charges dropped and elected to a second term by an overwhelming majority

President Raymond Becker
 President in: The Day After Tomorrow
 Caricature of Dick Cheney
 Played by: Kenneth Welsh
 Former vice president, succeeds President Richard Blake, who failed to escape from Washington, D.C. to the south, after his death.
 Opposed the evacuation of the United States in the wake of an ensuing environmental disaster out of fear for the U.S. economy.
 Much of the U.S. is devastated by the onset of a new Ice Age that freezes most of the Northern Hemisphere.
 Leads the government-in-exile in Mexico.
 During his first address to the nation, he orders a nationwide search-and-rescue effort after the storms dissipate.
 Party: Republican

President Andrew Bee
 President in: Line of Succession by Brian Garfield (1972 novel).
 Former congressman and senator from California
 Chosen by Vice President Elect Dexter Ethridge to be his vice president if kidnapped President Elect Clifford Fairlie is not rescued.
 Takes office after Ethridge dies from wounds received in terrorist bombing of the US Senate, and Fairlie dies during an attempted rescue mission.
 Party: Republican

President-elect Cyrus Rutherford Beene
 President-elect in Scandal Season 6
 First openly gay President-elect. 
 Former White House Chief of Staff to President Fitzgerald Thomas Grant III.
 After he is fired from the White House he switches sides, managing the presidential campaign of Francisco Vargas, the Democratic Governor of Pennsylvania.
 Selected as vice presidential nominee by Vargas after he wins the Democratic primaries. 
 Becomes vice president-elect after Vargas wins the 2016 Presidential Election. 
 Elevated to president-elect mere hours later, after Vargas is assassinated during his victory speech in Fairmount Park on election night. Uncertainty after the election led to the Electoral College results being contested into Congress, with Republican nominee Mellie Grant ending up as president-elect instead, replacing Beene.
 After the covert assassination of Vice President Luna Vargas on Inauguration Day, Beene is nominated as her replacement but serves briefly until he is forced to resign for trying to usurp power from President Grant.
 Married to Michael Ambruso.
 Previously married to White House Press Secretary James Novak until his death.
 Played by: Jeff Perry
 Party: Democratic on paper, Republican in terms of ideology.

President Edward Bennett
 President in: Clear and Present Danger
 Orders a covert war against Colombian drug lords but is exposed by Jack Ryan.
 Played by: Donald Moffat

President Jonathan Bennett
 President in: Hellbent and Out of the Dark by Gregg Hurwitz
 Has been in office for five years as of Out of the Dark, facing a tough set of midterm elections and increasing Congressional scrutiny about the aggressive extent of his foreign and defense policy. 
 As Under Secretary of Defense for Policy during the 1990s, Bennett sanctions numerous off the books special operations using the Orphan Program, a secret US government initiative that trains teenage orphans to become highly skilled assassins.
 During his presidency, Bennett supports Charles Van Sciver, a ruthless and highly skilled Orphan, to become the Orphan Program Director. Bennett orders the assassinations of all Orphan operatives not loyal to Van Sciver to cover up his own role in sanctioning operations during his time as Under Secretary of Defense.
 Van Sciver, under Bennett's orders, eliminates former Orphans but fails to kill Evan Smoak, known as Orphan X, who had been the one to carry out the assassination of the Serbian Foreign Minister. Van Sciver is killed by Smoak, who then threatens Bennett that he would assassinate him.
 In response, Bennett assembles a team led by his close ally and Orphan, A, Judd Holt, to eliminate Smoak. He also marshals the Secret Service against Smoak, but does not tell them why Smoak was trying to assassinate him.
 Smoak kills Bennett's White House Deputy Chief of Staff Doug Wetzel, who had been also complicit in the assassinations, as well as staging a mortar attack on Bennett's motorcade. Smoak kills Holt and the criminals he had assembled.
 The numerous attempts on his life drive Bennett into intense paranoia about how Smoak would kill him, with Smoak planting poison in the lens of Bennett's glasses. The poison slowly filters into Bennett's skin, causing him to have a fatal heart attack in the Oval Office. Smoak then releases evidence of Bennett's crimes to ruin his legacy after his death.

President Monroe Bennett
 President in: Salvation 
 Served as vice president under President Pauline Mackenzie.
 Is in office during a time of crisis when a large asteroid codenamed "Samson" is scheduled to crash into the Earth. He tries to redirect measures taken to destroy the asteroid to have it break into smaller ones, which would be redirected to land on and decimate both Russia and China, nations he believed posed a significant threat to the United States.
 Believing Mackenzie to be too weak to proceed with such a plan, he conspires to poison her with mercury, deteriorating her health to the point where she suffered from memory loss and a stroke whilst addressing the nation in the Oval Office. 
 Upon reports that the stroke is fatal, he ascends to the presidency under the 25th Amendment, and later tries to proceed with nuclear military action against Russia after it appeared they attacked a United States Navy ship. The attack was actually the work of militant hacker group RE/SYST, whose desire was to help deteriorate US-Russian relations.
 Mackenzie is later revealed to be alive and recovering in secret from the mercury poisoning, and has Secretary of Defense Harris Edwards and others loyal to her detain Bennett beneath the White House so she can appeal to the Cabinet and the military to be reinstated. 
 Before he can be imprisoned for treason he is recaptured from United States Secret Service custody by members of the United States Army loyal to him. After hiding out in an abandoned military base for a week, he emerges and takes his case to the Supreme Court of the United States, arguing he is still lawfully president and his removal from office was illegal and unconstitutional. When the court appears to vote in Mackenzie's favour, he orchestrates bombing of the building which seriously injures the Chief Justice, whose swing vote in the decision had yet to be announced.
 After the Supreme Court bombing, the capital falls into chaos as infighting between United States Armed Forces factions loyal to Bennett and others to Mackenzie battle to take control. US Army and Secret Service officers loyal to Bennett lock down and infiltrate the White House, capturing and detaining Mackenzie in the Oval Office.
 As Bennett is about to address the nation, video footage of the now conscious Chief Justice is broadcast on all networks and cell phones, in which he confirms his vote in Mackenzie's favour, shifting the decision to 5-4 and rendering her the legal president. After a brief standoff, the soldiers accompanying Bennett realize they have been deceived and reaffirm their allegiance to Mackenzie, and then place Bennett under arrest along with their own commanding general who led the assault on the White House.
 Played by: Sasha Roiz

President Richard Benson
 President in: Megiddo: The Omega Code 2
 Played by: R. Lee Ermey

President Thomas "Tug" Benson
 President in: Hot Shots! Part Deux
 Former navy admiral
 Played by: Lloyd Bridges

President Joseph Emerson Benton
 President in: Ultimatum by Matthew Glass
 Elected in 2032 as the 48th president
 Main character in the novel, who faces an inevitable mass relocation of inhabitants of coastal and semi-arid locations as global warming worsens, while trying to negotiate a deal with the Chinese government on emissions cutbacks.
 Party: Democratic

President William F. Berndt
 President in: Ragland by Jerry van Orsdell (1972 novel).
 Former U.S. Senator.
 Dies in office from a massive heart attack.

President Matthew Bernstein
 President in: 2030: The Real Story of What Happens to America
 First Jewish President
 Former Speaker of the House
 President when massive earthquake hits Los Angeles
 Divorces wife while in office
 Party: Democratic

President Charles Berquist
 President in: The Parsifal Mosaic

President Berzowski (first name not given)
 President in: For Us, The Living by Robert Heinlein
 Becomes president in 2001

President Anna Bester
 President in: Eclipse Trilogy
 Also called "the American Margaret Thatcher", Bester is in office during a third World War with Russia.
 Towards the end of the war, Bester's administration suffers a major political scandal when it is revealed that she collaborated with the Second Alliance Security Corporation, a front organization for a global neo-fascist conspiracy.
 Party: most likely Republican

President Philip Bester
 President in: Shadowrun
 44th U.S. President (2005–2009)
 Defeats incumbent Martin Hunt in the 2004 election.
 Defeated by Jesse Garrety in the 2008 election.

President "The Big Guy"
 President in: World War Z
 First Black president of Jamaican descent - implied to be Colin Powell, due to his military background.
 President of a bipartisan administration based in the new American capital of Honolulu.
 Succeeds his predecessor who dies of catatonic shock after the ill-fated Battle of Yonkers
 After a period of relative stability in the new world, he decides to take the United States back on the offensive against 200 million zombies
 Dies in office and is replaced by Vice President "The Wacko" (implied to be Howard Dean)

President Bill
 President in: President Bill, A Graphic Epic by William L. Brown.
Becomes president after winning a lottery.

President Hosea Blackford
 President in: American Empire: The Center Cannot Hold
 First appears in the first novel How Few Remain.
 From the State of Dakota (North and South Dakota not having been established as separate states possibly due to the decline of the Republicans), Blackford meets Abraham Lincoln as a young man during the Second Mexican War and was inspired to pursue a political career, becoming a Socialist and serving as congressman from Dakota.
 Runs for vice president in 1920 under Upton Sinclair and the wins over Democratic incumbent Theodore Roosevelt, who was running for a unprecedented third term. The ticket is re-elected in 1924. Personally believing that the position of Vice President held little influence, Blackford described himself as a "$12,000 a year hat rack".
 Defeats Calvin Coolidge for the presidency in 1928 by a narrow margin and becomes the 30th President of the United States.
 Blackford was unable to prevent the Business Collapse in 1929. The Pacific War against Japan erupts in 1932, and the Japanese attack Los Angeles during a Socialist campaign rally. Blackford is defeated by Coolidge in a landslide in the 1932 election, but Coolidge dies on January 5, 1933, of a heart attack less than a month before taking office. Coolidge's running mate, Herbert Hoover, becomes the 31st president on February 1.
 Married to Socialist congresswoman from New York Flora Blackford (née Hamburger) and had a son, Joshua Blackford.
 Dies in 1937. At his state funeral in his native Dakota, outgoing President Hoover and former President Sinclair serve as his pallbearers.

President Stephen Henry Blades
 President in: Letter 44 (comic book series, 2013– )
 44th President of the United States.
 Learns upon taking office that NASA discovered an alien artifact in asteroid belt seven years earlier, and that a secret crewed mission has been sent out to investigate it.
 First Lady: Isobel; son: Mark.

President Richard Blake
 President in: The Day After Tomorrow
 Caricature of George W. Bush
 Orders the mass evacuation of the south of the U.S. into Mexico, after cancelling all debt to Mexico in order for the Mexican government to agree to house the surviving US and Canadian citizens.
 Refuses to leave the White House during the snowstorm, instead still trying to get surviving people evacuated. Leaves eventually after being persuaded to evacuate to the refugee camps in Mexico.
 Dies of hypothermia after Marine One crashes due to its wings freezing, and is succeeded by Vice President Becker.
 Party: Republican
 Played by: Perry King

President Robert Blair
 President in: Saint (novel)
 Survives an assassination attempt by Johnny Drake under the identity Carl Saint.
 Is President in 2033, 23 years after the Raison Crisis.

President George Blush
 President in: America 2014: An Orwellian Tale (novel)
 Fourth-term president

President John Blutarsky
 President in: Where Are They Now? A Delta Alumni Update
 Played by John Belushi

President Donald Blythe
 President in: House of Cards
 Acting President after the attempted assassination of President Frank Underwood
 Signs the Presidential Incapacitation Certificate in Chapter 43; Underwood declares himself fit and is reinstated in Chapter 45
 Party: Democratic

President Bolton
 President in: Last Resort
 Is under impeachment proceedings by Congress when he orders a nuclear attack on Pakistan.
 When members of the United States Navy aboard the Ohio-class ballistic missile submarine USS Colorado refuse to carry out the order, they are branded as traitors by his administration, who attempts to have them killed by another submarine, the USS Illinois. Bolton then has other US forces launch the attack on Pakistan.
 Is almost removed from office when members of the United States government, United States Armed Forces and United States Secret Service meet in secret to organize and plot a coup d'etat. The coup fails when the lead conspirator, Speaker of the House of Representatives Conrad Buell, confesses to the machinations live on C-SPAN before committing suicide in the chamber.
 Is assassinated by lobbyist Kylie Sinclair.

President Allison Bonner
 President in Steve Pieczenk's 1992 Book Maximum Vigilance.
 Former Vice President to President Donald Westview.
 Becomes President after Westview resigns after a mental breakdown.

President Andrew Boone
President in: Swing Vote
Incumbent President seeking re-election.
With New Mexico's electoral college votes hanging on the decision of apolitical apathetic voter Bud Johnson, Boone attempts to win his vote by endorsing same-sex marriage and environmental protection.
The fate of the election is left unknown, with Bud deciding to hold a debate between the two candidates, asking questions submitted via mail.
Played by Kelsey Grammer
Party: Republican

President Betty Boop
Elected president in Betty Boop for President (1932)
It is unclear whether the cartoon shows  actual scenes from Betty's presidency or merely visions of her proposals
Apparently favors the repeal of Prohibition

President Robert L. Booth

 President in: Judge Dredd
Booth is the last President of the United States.
 He triggers the Third World War in 2070, and is deposed and sentenced for 100 years.

President Borman
President in: "AKA Superman" (Lois & Clark: The New Adventures of Superman)
Former president who put the Annihilator Satellite in orbit, but Congress cancelled funding before it could be activated.
Is defeated for re-election by President Garner.

President Marion Bosworth
President in: Call of Duty: Black Ops II and Call of Duty: Strike Team
Former Speaker of the House
Party: Democratic

President Sherman Bothwell
President in: Rama II
Nicknamed "Slugger"; former professional baseball player for the Boston Red Sox at the Fenway Dome during the 2170s and 2180s.
Is president during the late 2190s; elected in 2196 in a landslide and is eligible for re-election in 2200.
Originally from Missouri and is married to Linda Black, the daughter of the governor of Texas. His first wife died in a boating accident, leaving him a single father, which makes him popular with the U.S. electorate.
He is opposed by the U.S. Christian Conservative Party.

President Marge Bouvier
 President in: "The Last Temptation of Homer" (The Simpsons)
 Native of Springfield.
 Bouvier would have been president had she not married Homer; her presidency is shown in a vision to Homer by his guardian angel. She seems to have high approval ratings.

President David Bowers
 President in: the Splinter Cell series of video games
 Leads the U.S. during the Georgian Information Crisis in Georgia and a rebellion in Indonesia, and defends South Korea during an American-Japanese conspiracy that aimed to start World War III.
 Survives a failed nuclear attack on Nashville, Tennessee, by American terrorists.
 Republican

President Andrew Bradford
 President in: The Second Lady
 During the Cold War, First Lady Billie Bradford is kidnapped by the KGB and replaced with a Soviet agent who has been surgically altered and specially trained to temporarily take her place in the international spotlight. Through her, the USSR hopes to discover an American secret that could tip the balance of global power in favor of the Soviet Union.
 Party: Democratic

President Bradley
President in: War in the Ice by Simulations Publications Inc. (board game)
In 1991 war breaks out between the U.S. and the Soviet Union in Antarctica.
Is defeated for re-election in 1992 primarily because of the war.

President Mike Brady
 President in: The Brady Bunch in the White House
 Native of California with no political experience.
Vice President Brady assumes the presidency President Lawrence Randolph resigns. Brady then chooses his wife Carol to be his vice president. Brady has six children (three of his own, and three stepdaughters from Carol Brady's previous marriage).
 Played by: Gary Cole

President Daniel Brand
 President in: Amerika
 Elected in 1988 over Senator Christopher Winthrop and Congressman Devin Milford.
 President of the United States after the U.S. is crippled by a surprise Soviet EMP Attack and agrees to disarmament.
 Party: Democratic

President Daniel Brandenburg
 President in: Alternities by Michael P. Kube-McDowell (1988).
 Wins the 1976 election by defeating Republican incumbent Roland Maxwell and Democratic Party nominee Mike Mansfield.
 As president, Brandenburg personally oversees response to an incursion by people from an alternate timeline.
 Party: National

President Branford
 President in: Jack & Bobby
 Attempts to bring the War of the Americas to an end.

President Susan Brayden
 President in: DC's Legends of Tomorrow, The Flash (2014), and Arrow
 Becomes president on Earth-1 after Dominators kill the previous (unnamed) president in 2016.
 Played by: Lucia Walters.

President Breckinridge
 President in: Megiddo: Omega Code 2
 Former Secretary of State to Presidents Richard Benson and David Alexander.
 Declares himself president when Alexander is framed for his father's murder.

President Henry Brendan
 President in: Falseface, by Marilyn Sharpe.
 Vice President to President Benjamin Riker, who is killed in a skiing accident which turns out to have been an assassination.
 President Brendan is targeted for assassination at a Shuttle Launch but is saved by a pair of spies.

President Howard Brewster
 President in: Line of Succession by Brian Garfield (1972 novel)
 Defeated for re-election by Clifford Fairlie.
 When Fairlie is abducted on a goodwill mission in Spain and Fairlie's vice president-elect is killed as a result of a terrorist bombing of the Senate, Brewster attempts to remain in office.
 The line of succession is restored by Vice President Elect Dexter Ethridge's decision to choose Congressman Andrew Bee as his vice president should Fairlie not be rescued.
 Party: Democratic

President Breyer
 President in: The Venture Bros.
 Exemplifies the worst qualities of George W. Bush, Bill Clinton, and Lyndon B. Johnson, according to the showrunners
 Played by Dana Snyder

President Bricker
 President in: The Man in the High Castle
 Succeeds Franklin D. Roosevelt as president
 Unable to revive economy during the Great Depression
 Is an isolationist

President Teddy Bridges

 President in: Commander-in-Chief
 Theodore "Teddy" Roosevelt Bridges is governor of California and vice president before becoming president. His vice president is Mackenzie Allen, who becomes the first female president after he dies.
 On his deathbed after brain surgery, he asks Allen to step aside in favor of a "more appropriate" successor. He later dies, and Allen succeeds him.
 Played by: Will Lyman
 Party: Republican

President Hawley Briggs
 President in: The Red President by Martin Gross
 Former U.S. Air Force general and senator from Arkansas.
 Is appointed vice president by President Jed Hankins.
 Becomes president when Hankins is assassinated by his pro-Soviet chief of staff.
 Forces the Soviets to back down during a crisis.
 Party: Democratic

President Bristol
 President in: I, Martha Adams, by Pauline Glen Winslow (novel)
 Former left-wing U.S. Senator.
 Is vice president during a Soviet nuclear attack that destroys U.S. Strategic Forces.
 Becomes president after the U.S. surrenders and President Carmody resigns.

President-elect Phil Bristol
 President in: Protect and Defend by Eric L. Harry
 Bristol is the governor of California who wins the presidency, but is assassinated by anarchists at the Willard Hotel prior to his inauguration. He is succeeded by Gordon Davis.
 Party: Republican

President Henry Parker Britland III
 President in: My Gal Sunday by Mary Higgins Clark
 Former U.S. senator from New Jersey.
 Is elected president at the age of 35 and serves two terms.
 After he leaves office, marries a reporter turned U.S. representative.

President Wyndom Brody
 President in: "Decompression" (The Outer Limits)
 As a senator, Brody wins the New Hampshire primary and is flying to South Carolina for the primary when he is approached by a visitor from the future calling for Brody to save himself by jumping from his aircraft.
 In an alternate universe, President Brody becomes a selfish tyrant, and is killed when he jumps from his aircraft over Columbia, South Carolina.
 Played by: Bruce Boxleitner

President Roy Bromwell
 President in: Rival Schools: United by Fate
 Shown in Roy's ending in the game as a flash forward set 20 years after the events of the game (where Roy is only in high school).
 Roy's high school classmate Tiffany is shown in the sequence as the First Lady.

President John Broward
 President in: the 2000 Twilight role-playing game.
 Former Governor of Arkansas who appoints himself to the U.S. Senate, and is elected president by them.
 World War Three breaks out in 1995, and on Thanksgiving Day 1997 nuclear strikes take place in the U.S. The president and those in line of succession are killed in the exchange.
 Broward takes office after congress regroups after the attack, but the U.S. military does not recognize the legality.

President Abraham Brown
 President in: The Music Master of Babylon by Edgar Pangborn (1954)
 In 2020, he successfully guides the country through the terrible experience of a Second Civil War, in the course of which nuclear weapons are used and large parts of New York City destroyed. He lives long enough to see the world devastated in "The Final War" of 2070. In the aftermath, Brown's hometown of Newburgh, New York, becomes the center of a short-lived "North American Soviet", whose members arrest Brown and torture him to death. After the fall of the regime, Brown is revered by survivors as "a martyr who gave his life for the people". Gradually, with few records left from before the worldwide destruction, Brown's memory is conflated with that of Jesus Christ as well as Abraham Lincoln and the Biblical Abraham, to create the divine figure of "Abraham" whose worship is the basis of "The Holy Murkan Church" in Pangborn's later novel Davy.

President Jennifer Brown
 President in the Y: The Last Man television series.
 Originally a US Congresswoman and chair of the House Intelligence Committee, after a cataclysmic event simultaneously killed all mammals with a Y chromosome except for her son Yorick Brown and his pet monkey Ampersand, she was elevated to president by being elected House Speaker (a position she held for an hour) after most of the presidential line of succession died.
 With the remnants of the US Government having to relocate to the Pentagon, her administration is occupied with the aftermath of the event, namely rioting, failing infrastructure, internal displacement, shortages and the Arizona state government being held hostage by a militia demanding an explanation for the die-off.
 A power struggle ensues when Regina Oliver, the Secretary of Veterans Affairs to deceased Republican President Ted Campbell, is found alive in an Israeli field hospital, believed to have been killed as a result of the die-off. Being the sole surviving eligible member of the previous presidential line of succession, Oliver is widely considered a 'fringe lunatic' and an 'anti-immigrant, anti-government, anti-vaxxer with a Twitter following' but is reinstated to her position in the Cabinet to placate her. A caucus of surviving Republican congresswomen, senators and other officials led by Kimberly Campbell Cunningham, President Campbell's politically-active daughter, seek to reinstall a Republican administration and to restore a cis-male population (and, by extension, the patriarchy and basis of their previous influence), but are hesitant due to Oliver's fringe ideologies.
 To resolve the reproductive crisis, Brown secretly orders Culper Ring operative Agent 355 to bodyguard Yorick outside of the Pentagon and to locate geneticist Dr Allison Mann. After reported sightings of Yorick and suspicions of a conspiracy, Brown admits to and defends the cover-up when pressed by Oliver and Kimberly, losing support amongst the Cabinet as Agent 355 killed two pilots who had helped rescue Yorick from New York (viewed by the Cabinet as either being on Brown's direct orders or the actions of a rogue agent) and as Yorick is seemingly now outside of government control or protection.
 Shortly after Brown is removed from office, Yorick's ex-girlfriend Beth DeVille (who had rejected his offer of marriage just before the die-off) leads a raid on the Pentagon to take control of its amenities, accidentally shooting and killing the newly-installed President Oliver in the process and allowing Brown to escape after learning that Yorick is still alive. However, Brown and DeVille along with Sam Jordan (a friend of Brown's daughter, Hero) are captured and detained by surviving members of the Culper Ring.
 In the original comic book series, Jennifer Brown was elevated to Secretary of the Interior after the Secretary of Agriculture Margaret Valentine (based on Ann Margaret Veneman) was sworn in as president. Brown originally served as the Representative for Ohio's 22nd district (which ceased to exist following the die-off), and was an anti-abortion Democrat.
 Party: Democratic.
 Played by: Diane Lane.

President Paul Buckingham
President in: Deterrence
Vice President Buchanan resigns during his term.
Warns China against military action in 2007.
Dies in office in October 2007, succeeded by appointed Vice President Walter Emerson.
Played by: James Handy.

President Porter Brunreich

 President in: the Timeline Wars series by John Barnes. 
 Porter Brunreich, an exceptionally intelligent and gifted ten years old girl, accompanies her mother and flees Pittsburgh to escape her abusive and violent father. She and her mother board a plane to Seattle.  A war takes place across millions of alternate timelines. A slave society from an alternate timeline instructs terrorists under their control to stage a hostage crisis at Seattle Airport and kill Porter. Her mother saves her by sacrificing herself. Porter is deeply traumatized and guilt-ridden after seeing her mother die, and for some months lives on the city streets. She is adopted by Mark Strang, an agent of the Timeliners opposing the "Masters". As a teenager, she becomes a world class musician, and tours many countries. The attempts on her life continue: In Oslo, she kills two assailants with a gun; in Weimar, Porter and her companions are nearly killed, but manage to time travel to when Julius Caesar crossed the Rubicon and started his march to seize power in Rome. Porter fascinates Caesar by playing the Roman lyre and performing modern musical pieces on it. He tries to rape Porter, but her bodyguard Paula kills him. With great difficulty, Porter and her companions are brought to late 20th-century Europe. When she is elected, she informs the world about the war across the timelines. The world could not afford to remain disunited, divided into various countries acting at cross purposes.

Censor Bryan

 President in: A Different Flesh
 In an alternate timeline where Homo erectus (called "sims") and megafauna from the Pleistocene era survived in the Western Hemisphere, Britain's American colonies secede earlier in 1738 to form the Federated Commonwealths of America, the development of a British absolutist monarchy being cited as the main impetus. The constitution of the Federated Commonwealths is modelled more so on the Roman Republic than that of the real-life United States, with the country being governed by two chief executives who can veto each other. Censors serve a single non-renewable five-year term and serve as senators for life (alongside commonwealth governors) after leaving office.
 Serving as one of the two censors in 1988, Bryan calls for an investigation into the handling of a riot by sims' rights activists protesting the use of sims for HIV research. The investigation was vetoed by Bryan's opposite, Censor Jennings.

President John Robert Burgess
 President in: The Talbott Agreement by Richard M. Garvin and Edmond G. Addeo (1968 novel).
 Widower and former U.S. Senator from Pennsylvania.

President Cecily Burke
 President in: The First
 From the Midwestern United States.
 Presumably elected in 2032, and is stated to have lost Missouri during the election. 
 In office in 2033 during the disastrous maiden voyage of Providence I, a planned mission to Mars, which explodes due to rocket malfunction.
 Attempts to remain neutral during the legislative debate to fund the Providence II mission, as the Providence Program was started in her predecessors administration. 
 Is hounded by her opponents for wasteful spending towards NASA and private space company Vista during their lengthy preparations for the Providence II mission, threatening to have the Speaker of the House table a bill to freeze funding should they not speed up the process. 
 After repairs to the Mars Ascent Vehicle fail, President Burke informs both NASA and Vista CEO Laz Ingram she will not be supporting the Providence II mission. However, the mission goes ahead when all the astronauts on the mission legally acknowledge the increased risks. 
 Played by: Jeannie Berlin

President Rachel Burke
 President in: An Acceptable Loss 
 Previously served as Vice President of the United States, when she helped develop the "Total Victory" strategy to fight the War on Terror.
 Encourages and oversees a catastrophic nuclear strike on the city of Homs, Syria, known as Plan 712. The attack wipes out over 100,000 people, but succeeds in killing the leaders of multiple international terrorist groups (including ISIS, Al-Queda, Hezbollah, Al-Nusra Front and Jaysh al-Sham), as well as a rogue scientist from the Atomic Energy Organization of Iran, who were meeting in the city to discuss strategy.
 Attempts to silence her former national security advisor Dr. Elizabeth Lamm from leaking controversial details of the approval of the operation by offering her the position of United States Secretary of State, but is rebuffed.
 Despite refusing to have Lamm assassinated, her White House Chief of Staff takes matters into his own hands and has Lamm killed by a parcel bomb.
 Played by: Jamie Lee Curtis

President Hugo Burlap
 President in: Whoops Apocalypse
 Former circus clown from Cleveland, Ohio.
 Dies in office after a reporter hits him in the stomach at President Burlap's request to show how fit he is.

President Burns
 President in: "Trial by Fire" (The Outer Limits)

President Clint Bushton
 President in: RollerCoaster Tycoon 3
 He is one of the five VIPeeps (Very Important Peeps) in the game.
 Name is derived from the surnames of George W. Bush and Bill Clinton.

President Butler
 President in: Bring the Jubilee
 President of the United States after its defeat in the Civil War during the 1870s.
President Burke

• President in: Modern Combat 4: Zero Hour

• Captured by Edward Page during a conference in Hawaii. Later rescued by Cpl. Blake and Extracted by Lt. Downs and Walker in a transport helicopter.

References

Lists of fictional presidents of the United States